Dagen may refer to:

Newspapers
 Dagen (Danish newspaper)
 Dagen (1803-1843), defunct Danish newspaper
 Dagen (Norwegian newspaper)
 Dagen (Swedish newspaper)
 Dagen (1845-1846), defunct Swedish newspaper
 Dagen (1896-1920), defunct Swedish newspaper

People with the surname
Lacy Dagen (born 1997), American artistic gymnast

People with the first name
Dagen McDowell (born 1969), American business news anchor

Other uses
 Dagen, Iran, a village in Kurdistan Province, Iran